CALL/360:BASIC was an IBM dialect of the BASIC programming language for the System/360 and later platforms. It was based on mid-1960s versions of Dartmouth BASIC but added a number of extensions. Most of these were related to file handling, which, at that time, Dartmouth lacked. Differences are otherwise minor.

History
CALL/360:BASIC was announced in 1968, along with several other languages for the system including APL and FORTRAN and the Datatext markup language based text editor. Early advertizing for the system boasted that one could "Start learning CALL / 360 : BASIC after breakfast and you can share our computer before lunch".

The CALL/360 suite was developed within IBM's Information Marketing department. Initially, the products were considered proprietary and could only be accessed via the online service. Customer demand forced them to offer these products to other System/360 users, which they did by releasing it on an "as is" basis with no support. Later the same year, IBM transferred this department, along with the rest of its timesharing services, to the Service Bureau Corporation (SBC), including the CALL/360 operating system and CALL/360:BASIC. Manuals after that date refer to the language as an SBC product.

In 1973, SBC was itself transferred to Control Data Corporation as part of a long running anti-trust lawsuit.

Description 
CALL/360:BASIC is almost identical to Dartmouth BASIC the Fourth, including support for the advanced rix math features. It differs primarily in its support of file handling.

Basics 
The language included the commands LET, PRINT, END, FOR...NEXT with an optional , GOTO, GOSUB...RETURN, IF...THEN, IF...GOTO, DEF, READ, DATA, RESTORE DIM, and REM. To this list, it added computed GOTO of the form . The ,  and  commands could also be followed by a comment string, where a colon was not required.

 was expanded with  followed by a line number. The line referred to started with a colon and then a series of formatting strings. This series of strings was known as an "image". Items to be printed could be separated by commas or semicolons, with commas having "print zones" 18-characters wide. A new command, stopped the program with a statement  and then waited for the user to enter text, which was ignored. The end-of-line character caused the program to continue. It could also be followed by a comment in the source.

CALL/360 included string variables, only recently introduced to Dartmouth, using the same dollar-sign notation. It added the ability to delimit string constants with either single or double quotes, as well as the ability to type two of either character within a string to include a single character of that type. For instance,  represents . Strings were broken into 18-character lengths internally, and strings that did not use up an entire 18-character record were padded with blanks, meaning  would be interpreted as 18 spaces.

Arrays and matrix math 
Like early versions of Dartmouth, CALL/360:BASIC supported one and two dimensional arrays, with the lower index always being 1. Thus an array defined using  contains three values, A(1) through A(3). CALL/360 also added the ability to define string arrays, with each entry being a single 18-character string. In contrast to Dartmouth, it does not appear variables were always DIMed; in Dartmouth one could refer to  without dimensioning A, in which case it had a default behaviour of being . The manual does not explicitly say CALL/360 does not do this, but it does state variables cannot be used in matrix operations without being dimensioned. A maximum of 29 numeric arrays were allowed in a program, with the total sum of the elements across all arrays being no more than 7167. 

CALL/360:BASIC included most of the matrix commands from Dartmouth, including the ability to perform basic math on a matrix as a single operation, like  where A is an array that will then have all of its elements multiplied by 10.

Files 
The major addition to CALL/360:BASIC was a usable file handling system. Writing was handled by the otherwise identical . The file pointer could be moved back to the start of the file with  followed by one or more file numbers. There was no way to specify a position within a file.  with a similar list of one or more file numbers freed the file handles.

Example 
The following program opens the file  for input as file handle 10, and then reads lines of data containing a product name and four sales prices in a loop. Notice that the loop is not terminated, instead, this program ends when it runs out of data and causes a  error. How control is passed to line 70 at that point is not explained in the manual. The output to the screen is formatted using the image on line 50.

Notes

References

Citations

Bibliography
 
 

IBM software
BASIC programming language